Joker is a 2019 American psychological thriller film directed and produced by Todd Phillips, who co-wrote the screenplay with Scott Silver. The film was produced by Warner Bros. Pictures, DC Films, and Joint Effort, in association with Bron Creative and Village Roadshow Pictures, and distributed by Warner Bros. Based on DC Comics characters, the film stars Joaquin Phoenix as the Joker. Set in 1981, it follows Arthur Fleck, a failed stand-up comedian whose descent into insanity and nihilism inspires a violent countercultural revolution against the wealthy in a decaying Gotham City. Robert De Niro, Zazie Beetz, Frances Conroy, Brett Cullen, Glenn Fleshler, Bill Camp, Shea Whigham, and Marc Maron appear in supporting roles.

Joker premiered at the 76th Venice International Film Festival on August 31, 2019, where it won the Golden Lion, and was released in the United States on October 4, 2019. Critical reception was generally positive, with critics praising Phoenix's performance, musical score, cinematography and visuals, although its dark tone received some criticism. The portrayal of mental illness and handling of violence also drew concerns of inspiring real-life violence. The film was a box office success, setting records for an October release and grossing over $1 billion, making it the first R-rated film to pass the billion-dollar mark at the worldwide box office and the sixth-highest-grossing film of 2019. At the 92nd Academy Awards, the film earned 11 nominations (including Best Picture), winning Best Actor for Phoenix and Best Original Score for Hildur Guðnadóttir. Phoenix and Guðnadóttir also won at the Golden Globe and BAFTA Award ceremonies. The American Film Institute selected Joker as one of the top 10 films of 2019. Joker was widely praised by fans and audiences as one of the best movies of the year.

Accolades

Notes

See also 
 2019 in film

References

External links 
 

Lists of accolades by film
Joker (character) in other media